"Tria Tragoudia" (Three Songs) is the third EP by Greek artist Eleftheria Arvanitaki that was released in 2004. It was certified Gold by the IFPI.

Track listing 
"Pao Na Piaso Ourano"
"Oi Filoi Mou De S' Agapoun"
"Telos Den Iparhi Edo"

References

2004 EPs
Eleftheria Arvanitaki EPs